Tu Hnine Ma Ya Tae Myittar is a 2021 Burmese drama television series. It aired on MRTV-4, from March 8 to April 15, 2021, on Mondays to Fridays at 19:00 for 29 episodes.

Cast
Yan Aung as Uncle Lay
Min Thu as Sit Min
Nay Dway as Wai Yan Oo
Sit Naing as Shine Htet Naung
Aye Chan Maung as Dr. Zwe La Min
Ei Si Kway as Myint Mo, Pu Too
Min Khant Nyi as Thar Cho
Kaung Sett Htoo as U Min Lwin
Khine Hnin Wai as Mon Mon Kyaw
Poe Ei Ei Khant as Pont Pont
Nan Shwe Yi as Su Hnin Pwint
Khin Thazin as Daw Ami Htun
Saung Yoon San as Wai Mon Oo
Hnin Oo Wai as Ei Mon Min
Ei Shoon Madi Moe as Daw Yu Ya Nwe
Soe Moe Kyi as Daw Cho
War War Aung as Daw Thuzar
Aung Khine as U Wai Lin
Aung Zaw Min as U Phoe Toke

See also
Kyee Myat Thaw Martar

References

Burmese television series
MRTV (TV network) original programming